The Grand Rapids Flight were a team in the International Basketball League based in Grand Rapids, Michigan.

The Flight underwent a office change in 2007 when David Fox took over the roles of General manager and Head Coach from founder Tyler Whitcomb. The team was owned by the Grand Rapids Junior Jammers Youth Foundation from 2008–2010, a non-profit based in Grand Rapids, Michigan founded by David Fox. The team's Head Coach David Fox, coached the team for three seasons, and in his third season was the longest running tenured head coach in the IBL.

On the court, the team was a solid success in 2006, reaching the Final Four.

The Grand Rapids Flight at one time held the record for most points scored in a single game, after a 179–146 drubbing of the Des Moines Heat. The Flight helped to set the record for single game attendance against the Elkhart Express in 2007 as over 5,200 attended the game, many to see Sun Ming Ming.

The Flight made international news in 2007 by signing  basketball player Sun Ming Ming, still known as the tallest athlete in the world.

For the 2008 season the Flight played their home games at the Delta Plex Arena. The Delta Plex seats up to 4,400 for basketball. The Flight cited an upturn in attendance for this move.

The Grand Rapids Flight are unrelated to the former basketball team that played in Grand Rapids, the Grand Rapids Hoops.

Season By Season

All-Stars

2005
 Jason Boucher
 Mike Dyson
 Dametrius Kilgore
 James Singleton

2006
 Lamont Barnes
 Duke Cleveland

2007
 Micah Lancaster 
 Sun Mingming

References

External links
Official website

Sports in Grand Rapids, Michigan
2004 establishments in Michigan
2009 disestablishments in Michigan
Basketball teams established in 2004
Basketball teams disestablished in 2009